Motexafin lutetium is a texaphyrin, marketed as Antrin by Pharmacyclics Inc.

It is a photosensitiser for use in photodynamic therapy to treat skin conditions and superficial cancers.

It has also been tested for use in photoangioplasty (photodynamic treatment of diseased arteries).

It is photoactivated by 732 nm light which allows greater depth of penetration.

Clinical trials
Phase II clinical trials were in progress in 1999.

A phase I trial for prostate cancer reported in 2009.

References

Tetrapyrroles
Lutetium complexes